Aedes (Phagomyia) gubernatoris is a species complex of zoophilic mosquito belonging to the genus Aedes. It is found in India, Sri Lanka, Bangladesh, China, Nepal and Thailand. One subspecies described - A. g. kotiensis Barraud.

References

External links
Phagomyia Theobald, 1905 - Mosquito Taxonomic Inventory

gubernatoris